The 1995 Halloween Havoc was the seventh annual Halloween Havoc professional wrestling pay-per-view (PPV) event produced by World Championship Wrestling (WCW). It took place on October 29, 1995, from the Joe Louis Arena in Detroit, Michigan for the second consecutive year. In 2014, all of WCW's Halloween Havoc PPVs became available on WWE's streaming service, the WWE Network.

Production

Background
Halloween Havoc was an annual professional wrestling pay-per-view event produced by World Championship Wrestling (WCW) since 1989. As the name implies, it was a Halloween-themed show held in October. The 1995 event was the seventh event in the Halloween Havoc chronology and it took place on October 29, 1995, from the Joe Louis Arena in Detroit, Michigan for the second consecutive year.

Storylines
The event featured professional wrestling matches that involve different wrestlers from pre-existing scripted feuds and storylines. Professional wrestlers portray villains, heroes, or less distinguishable characters in the scripted events that build tension and culminate in a wrestling match or series of matches.

Event

Sgt. Craig Pittman pinned VK Wallstreet after Jim Duggan hit Wallstreet with a taped fist. Duggan's interference came after Big Bubba Rogers hit Pittman with his own taped fist to knock him out. After Diamond Dallas Page entered the ring, a fake Johnny B. Badd appeared at the entranceway (played by Joey Maggs) to distract Page and allow the real Badd to sneak up on Page from behind. The Zodiac replaced Kamala, who had left WCW. During the match, a fan hopped the barricade and entered the ring. Savage and Zodiac fought to the outside until the referee and security could escort the fan away. Meng was disqualified after The Taskmaster interfered on Meng's behalf. Brian Pillman and Arn Anderson were disqualified when Ric Flair turned on Sting. Hulk Hogan's "Hulkster" truck pushed Giant's "Dungeon of Doom" truck out of the circle for the win. This match took place on top of the nearby Cobo Hall. Although it was portrayed as live, the match was actually taped the previous night. WCW stunt co-ordinator Ellis Edwards portrayed the referee for this match, and the commentary team was joined by Bigfoot creator Bob Chandler. After the match, Hogan and The Giant began fighting, resulting in the Giant (kayfabe) falling off the side of the building.

In the main event Hogan was disqualified after Hart hit the referee with the WCW World Heavyweight Championship belt. Hart then turned on Hogan by hitting him with the title belt and joined the Dungeon of Doom. After the match The Yeti came to the ring and assisted Giant by putting Hogan in a double bearhug, so that they were both crushing Hogan at the same time (in what is considered one of the most awkward moments in pro wrestling history). Randy Savage came to the ring to try to save Hogan, as did Lex Luger. Lex Luger turned on Savage by attacking him and then put Hogan in the Torture Rack, joining the Dungeon of Doom. The Giant took the belt from the referee after the match and left with it; Jimmy Hart later revealed that he had a clause put in the contract that the title could change hands on a disqualification, but a week later on Nitro, The Giant was stripped of the title, because the disqualification was due to Hart's interference. The title belt was later rewarded to the winner of the 3 ring 60 man Battle Royal at WCW World War 3 1995, which was won by Randy Savage.

Results

References

Holidays themed professional wrestling events
Professional wrestling in Detroit
Events in Detroit
1995 in Michigan
Halloween Havoc
October 1995 events in the United States
1995 World Championship Wrestling pay-per-view events